Fiza Hussain, better known as Hareem Shah, is a Pakistani social media personality, active on TikTok.

Early life and education 
Born as Fiza Hussain in 1981, she later studied at a religious school.

She is a student of Masters of Philosophy in Comparative Religion at University of Peshawar.

Adult life 
In October 2019, a video of Shah's filmed inside Pakistan's Ministry of Foreign Affairs provoked criticism from prime minister Imran Khan, who ordered a probe into how she gained access to the building. The same year, Shah received backlash for her comments regarding federal minister Sheikh Rasheed Ahmad after a video recording of her conversation with him was leaked. In December 2019, she was harassed at an opening ceremony of a mall in Dubai.

On 28 June 2021, Hareem Shah confirmed her marriage to a Pakistan People’s Party member but kept did not divulge her husbands name. It was later confirmed to be Jitendra meena. 

In January 2021, Shah described a conversation with Mufti Qavi as "dirty" and "vulgar’"and claimed that he physically harassed Shah and her cousin. In March 2021, Shah filed an first information report against a friend for attempt to murder and physical assault.

In July 2021, there is online videos showing Shah smoking a sheesha went viral on social media.

References

Living people
TikTokers
People from Peshawar
University of Peshawar alumni
1991 births
Pakistani TikTokers

External links 

 Hareem Shah - TikTok